The Papal Navy ("Pontifical Navy") was the maritime force of the Papal States. Loosely construed, it was in sporadic existence from approximately the Battle of Ostia (849) during the pontificate of Leo IV until the ascension of Pope Leo XIII in 1878.

History
Originally protected by the Byzantine navy, the Papal States found themselves in need of a naval force of their own following a Muslim raid on Rome in 843 and the sack of the city's basilicas extra muros in 846. Under the leadership of Caesar, prince of Naples, a force of Neapolitan, Amalfitan, Gaetan, and Papal ships repulsed the pirates off Ostia in 849. 

Later, the Papal States subsidized various fleets during the Crusades and outfitted some squadrons of their own, which participated with Venice and others against the Ottoman Empire following the fall of Constantinople. With hired and affiliated ships from Tuscany and Malta, one Papal squadron participated in the Battle of Lepanto. Papal ships often assisted the Republic of Venice in her wars with the Ottoman Empire.

In 1715, Pope Clement XI constructed the Pontifical Arsenal near Porta Portese in Ripa Grande on the Tiber. In 1802, Napoleon donated two brigs to Pope Pius VII and the Papal Navy: the somewhat aged Saint Paul, and the brand-new Saint Pierre. Under the names San Paolo and San Pietro they sat in the arsenal at Civitavecchia for some years until they were discarded. 

Pontifical ships were protected by international treaty in 1819, but the navy only slowly recovered from the seizure of its vessels during the Napoleonic Wars. One was captured by Muslim pirates in 1826, but following a show of force by two frigates and a sloop-of-war from Piedmont under Captain Arnous, the Bey of Tripoli freed the ship with 10,600 francs compensation.

By 1823, the navy comprised the 12-gun schooner San Pietro, a cutter, a felucca, and a pinnace. Another twelve patrol boats armed with mortars performed coast guard duties in two squadrons, eight vessels in the Adriatic Sea and four in the Tyrrhenian. Lt. Col. Alessandro Cialdi directed an expedition to Egypt and then led three British steamers to Rome for navigation on the Tiber. A fourth steamer, the Roma, participated during the unrest of 1848, opposing the Austrian siege of Ancona.

In 1856, the separate Navy (Marina da Guerra), Finance Navy (Marina di Finanza), and Tiber Navy (Marina del Tevere) administrations were combined into the Pontifical Navy (Marina Pontificia).

As part of his break from the diplomatic policies of Pope Pius IX, Leo XIII sold off the last ship in the Papal Navy, the corvette Immacolata Concezione, during his first year in office. As the papacy had already been confined to Vatican City following the capture of Rome, it had been docked at Toulon, France. Its flag and a scale model of the vessel are in the Vatican Historical Museum in the Lateran Palace, Rome.

Ships
At Lepanto:
 Capitana ("flagship")
 Padrona ("squadron flagship")
 Suprema (Supreme)
 Serena (Serene)
 Pace (Peace)
 Vittoria (Victoria)
 Grifona (Gryphon)
 Santa Maria
 San Giovanni
 Regina (Queen)
 San Bonaventura (St. Bonaventure)
 San Pietro, a schooner
 , an earlier brig broken up in 1807
 Roma, a steamer
 Immacolata Concezione (Immaculate Conception), a corvette

See also
 Battle of Lepanto
 Battle of Ostia

References

Navy
Military history of the Mediterranean
Navies by country
Disbanded navies
840s establishments
9th-century establishments in the Papal States
1878 disestablishments in the Papal States
Naval warfare of the Early Modern period
Naval warfare of the Middle Ages
Naval history of Italy